Mukha Chithram is a 1991 Indian Malayalam-language comedy-drama mystery film directed by Suresh Unnithan. The film stars Jayaram, Urvashi, Siddique, Jagathy Sreekumar, KPAC Lalitha, Sunitha and Jagadheesh in lead roles. The film had musical score by Mohan Sithara.

Premise
Out of desperation, a school teacher asks a street musician, Mathukutty, to act as a qualified bandmaster in his school band. However, both of them struggle while keeping up the pretence.

Cast

Jayaram as Mathukutty / Sethumadhavan / Vareechan
Urvashi as Savithrikutty / Lakshmikutty
Siddique as Kannan Mash
Jagathy Sreekumar as Govinda Menon Mash
K. P. A. C. Lalitha as Gomathy Teacher
Sunitha as Sunanda Teacher
Jagadish as M. K. Pushkaran
Sankaradi as Sunanda's Father
Kollam Thulasi
Nedumudi Venu as Fr. Felix
N. L. Balakrishnan as Bahuleya Kurup
Meena Ganesh as Seller
Prof.Aliyar Kunju as Teacher
Rajaputhra Renjith
Sivaram

Soundtrack
The songs was composed by Mohan Sithara and the lyrics were penned by O. N. V. Kurup.

Awards
Kerala Film Critics Award
 Special Award - Jagathy Sreekumar
 Special Award - Suresh Unnithan
Kerala State Film Award
 Best Actress- Urvashi

References

External links
 
 

1991 films
1990s Malayalam-language films
Films scored by Mohan Sithara